The 2009 Kuwait wedding fire was an arson attack that occurred during a wedding ceremony in Oyoun, Jahra Governorate, Kuwait on 15 August 2009. At least 57 people were killed and about 90 others wounded when the groom's 23-year-old first wife, Nasra Yussef Mohammad al-Enezi, to take revenge for her husband taking a second wife, poured petrol on a tent where women and children were celebrating and set it on fire. Within three minutes the whole tent, which had only one exit and did not meet fire safety regulations, was engulfed in flames, trapping many inside. It was the deadliest civilian disaster in Kuwait in the last 40 years. Many of the bodies were burnt beyond recognition and had to be identified from DNA and dental records. It had been claimed that the temperature inside the tent was above 500 degrees Celsius (930 °F).

Nasra was arrested the following day and confessed. She was charged with premeditated, attempted murder, and arson, Her trial started in October 2009, and she denied the charges, claiming that she had confessed under duress due to threats. Nasra also claimed that she had lost a baby after she was given abortion pills by a prison employee related to her husband. In November 2009, Judge Adel al-Sager ordered her to undergo psychiatric tests after her defense lawyers claimed that she had suffered unspecified mental disorders when she was a child. He also agreed to her husband and her Asian maid. The two implicated her in starting the war. Nasra later claimed that she poured "cursed water" onto the tent in a black magic ritual, but not gasoline.

In March 2010, Nasra was found guilty of 57 counts of premeditated murder and starting a fire with the intent to kill and sentenced to death. She was hanged at Central Prison on 25 January 2017. She was one of 7 people executed in Kuwait that day. Nasra and one other woman executed with her were reportedly in a state of near-collapse when the time of their executions came.

References

2009 crimes in Kuwait
2009 fires in Asia
August 2009 crimes
Mass murder in 2009
Arson in Kuwait
Attacks on weddings